Harpalus suensoni is a species of ground beetle in the subfamily Harpalinae. It was described by Kataev in 1997.

References

suensoni
Beetles described in 1997